George Foot Moore (October 15, 1851 – May 16, 1931) was an eminent historian of religion, author, Presbyterian minister, 33rd Degree Mason of the Ancient and Accepted Scottish Rite, and accomplished teacher.

Life
Moore was born in West Chester, Pennsylvania, the son of Rev. William Eves Moore and Harriet Foot Moore.  He was educated at private schools, West Chester Academy and Wyer's School, entered Yale College as a junior in 1870, then graduated from Yale in 1872, as a Phi Beta Kappa and member of the Skull and Bones society. After teaching at Hopkins Grammar School from 1872 to 1873, he engaged in study and private teaching in Columbus, Ohio, 1873–74, then served as principal of Lancaster (Ohio) High School 1874-75. He studied theology in Columbus 1875-76 and graduated from Union Theological Seminary (New York) in 1877. He was ordained to the Presbyterian ministry at Columbus February 8, 1878, and became pastor of Putnam Presbyterian Church in Zanesville, Ohio, from 1878 to 1883. He Married Mary Soper, daughter of Albert Gallatin and Mary Ann (Chester) Hanford on April 25, 1878, in Chicago. They had two sons, William Eves, who died in infancy, and Albert Hanford.

In 1883 he was appointed to the chair of Hebrew at Andover Theological Seminary where he taught until 1902, serving as president of the seminary from 1899 to 1901 and  lectured on the history of religion from 1893 to 1901. During his service to Andover, he received the degree of Doctor of Divinity in 1885 from Marietta College, Ohio, and 12 years later, from Yale University in 1897. In 1902, he became a professor at the Harvard Divinity School, where he was appointed Frothingham Professor of the History of Religion in 1905, and Cabot Fellow for three years beginning in 1906. During his service at Harvard he obtained a degree of Legum Doctor in 1903 from Western Reserve University. He was a member of Harvard faculty from 1902 until retirement in 1928 and a preacher to the University from 1900 to 1903.

Moore was a member of the Deutsche Morgenlandische Gesellschaft, American Philological Association, Archaeological Institute of America, Society of Biblical Literature, among others, In addition, he was a Fellow of the American Academy of Arts and Sciences, serving as its president from 1921 to 1924, and was a member of the American Oriental Society. Besides contributing many articles on Biblical and Oriental subjects in learned journals, he wrote extensively for the "Encyclopaedia Biblica" and served as editor of the Harvard Theological Review. Among his books, History of Religions (1914, 1919) and Judaism (two volumes, 1927) stand out as especially praiseworthy. 

Moore preached at the Central Congregational Church in Providence Rhode Island at the dedication of its new building in 1893, and at the church's 50th Anniversary in 1902.

Mrs. Mary Soper Moore died April 16, 1924. Moore died 7 years later due to general arteriosclerosis and chronic myocarditis, in Cambridge, Massachusetts, May 16, 1931.

Works

Books

 - a 13 volume series published between 1916 and 1923.
 History of Religions (Vol. I, 1913; Vol. II, 1919)

 - original published in 3 vols between 1927 and 1930
 Editor (unfinished work), Albert Pike, Materials For The history of Freemasonry In France and Elsewhere on The Continent of Europe From 1718 To 1859, circa 1905, detached from "The New Age" magazine.
 - reprint of journal article

Chapters

Articles

References

External links

 
 

1851 births
1931 deaths
Harvard Divinity School faculty
Yale University alumni
Fellows of the American Academy of Arts and Sciences
American theologians
American orientalists
American historians of religion
American male non-fiction writers
Doctors of Divinity
People from West Chester, Pennsylvania